Maksim Alekseyevich Danilin (born 13 September 2001) is a Russian football player. He plays for FC Rodina-2 Moscow.

Club career
He made his debut in the Russian Football National League for FC Spartak-2 Moscow on 7 July 2019 in a game against FC Baltika Kaliningrad.

References

External links
 Profile by Russian Football National League
 
 
 

2001 births
Living people
Russian footballers
Russia youth international footballers
Association football midfielders
FC Spartak-2 Moscow players
FC Noah players
Russian First League players
Russian Second League players
Armenian Premier League players
Russian expatriate footballers
Expatriate footballers in Armenia
Russian expatriate sportspeople in Armenia